Rebeca Moreno (born June 17, 1986, in San Salvador, El Salvador) is a Salvadoran beauty queen who won the Nuestra Belleza Universo El Salvador pageant in 2008.

She is studying for her bachelor's degree in mathematics. She was the shortest contestant in Miss Universe 2008 and won the title of Miss Congeniality.

She is an active member of the international peace education organization, CISV International.

References

Living people
1986 births
People from San Salvador
Nuestra Belleza El Salvador
Salvadoran beauty pageant winners
Miss Universe 2008 contestants